The name Diane has been used for two tropical cyclones worldwide, one in the Atlantic Ocean and one in the South-West Indian Ocean.

In the Atlantic:
 Hurricane Diane (1955), caused US$831.7 million (1955 USD) in damage and 184 deaths in the Eastern United States

In the South-West Indian:
 Tropical Depression Diane (1960)
 Tropical Storm Diane (2020) - Caused flooding in Madagascar

Atlantic hurricane set index articles
South-West Indian Ocean cyclone set index articles